Chorley is a town and the administrative centre of the wider Borough of Chorley in Lancashire, England,  north of Wigan,  south west of Blackburn,  north west of Bolton,  south of Preston and  north west of Manchester. The town's wealth came principally from the cotton industry.

In the 1970s, the skyline was dominated by factory chimneys, but most have now been demolished: remnants of the industrial past include Morrisons chimney and other mill buildings, and the streets of terraced houses for mill workers. Chorley is the home of the Chorley cake.

History

Toponymy 
(also  or ) is a common element of place-name, meaning a clearing in a woodland;  refers to a person of status similar to a freeman or a yeoman.

Prehistory
There was no known occupation in Chorley until the Middle Ages, though archaeological evidence has shown that the area around the town has been inhabited since at least the Bronze Age. There are various remains of prehistoric occupation on the nearby Anglezarke Moor, including the Round Loaf tumulus which is believed to date from 3500 BC.

A pottery burial urn from this period was discovered in 1963 on land next to Astley Hall Farm and later excavation in the 1970s revealed another burial urn and four cremation pits dating from the Bronze Age.

Roman period
During the Roman era a Roman road ran near Chorley between Wigan and Walton-le-Dale. Hoards dating from the Roman period have also been found at nearby at Whittle-le-Woods and Heapey.

Medieval period
Chorley was not listed in the Domesday Book of 1086, though it is thought to be one of the twelve berewicks in the Leyland Hundred.

Chorley first appears in historical records in the mid thirteenth century as part of the portion of the Croston Lordship acquired by William de Ferrers, Earl of Derby, around 1250. The Earl established Chorley as a small borough comprising a two-row settlement arranged along what later became Market Street. It appears that the borough was short lived, as it does not appear in a report of a commission on the Leyland Hundred in 1341. It is most likely that the borough was sacked by the Scots during the Great Raid of 1322, with Chorley being one of the southernmost points reached in Northern England. This led to the construction of a Peel tower, which said to have been located somewhere close to Duxbury Hall.

The manorial history of Chorley is complex as the manor had no single lord throughout most of this period, as it had been split into moieties and was managed by several different families. This led to Chorley having several manorial halls, which in this period included Chorley Hall, built in the 14th century by the de Chorley family, which has since the 19th or 20th century been demolished. Very little is known of Chorley Hall, although according to what the painter John Bird painted in 1795, its location to where it once stood is said to have been where The Parish of St Laurence Church of England Primary School now stands, with phantom steps near to the school within Astley Park being the only physical clue to the hall's existence. There is also Lower Chorley Hall, which was owned by the Gillibrand family from 1583 (later rebuilt in the 19th century as Gillibrand Hall). It is believed the borough of Chorley was not a success in this period because of the lack of manorial leadership and the dispersed nature of the small population.
St Laurence's Church is the oldest remaining building in Chorley and first appears in historical records when it was dedicated in 1362, though it is believed there was already an earlier Anglo-Saxon chapel on the site which was a daughter foundation of Croston Parish Church. It is believed that the church is named after Saint Laurence, an Irish saint who died in Normandy in the 12th century, whose bones were conveyed to the church by local noble Sir Rowland Standish Duxbury, an ancestor of Myles Standish (an English military officer hired by the Pilgrims as military adviser for their Plymouth expedition to the New World).

As happened in many other instances following the Dissolution of the Monasteries, these relics went missing in the turmoil of the English Reformation under the rule of Henry VIII.

Chorley was granted a market charter by Henry VII in 1498 and have since held it every Tuesday. Before the reformation, it would coincide with a fair that was held annually on the feast of St Lawrence.

19th century to present

Chorley, like most Lancashire towns, gained its wealth from the Industrial Revolution of the 19th century which was also responsible for the town's growth. Chorley was a vital cotton town with many mills littering the skyline up to the late twentieth century. Most mills were demolished between the 1950s and 2000s with those remaining converted for modern business purposes. Today only a minority remain in use for actual manufacturing, and the last mill to stop producing textiles was Lawrence's in 2009.

Also, given its location on the edge of Lancashire Coalfield, Chorley was vital in coal mining. Several pits existed in Duxbury Woods, the Gillibrand area and more numerously in Coppull. Chisnall Hall Colliery at Coppull was considered the biggest Lancashire pit outside of Wigan and one of many located in the Chorley suburb. The last pit in the area to close was the Ellerbeck Colliery in 1987 which was located south of Chorley, between Coppull and Adlington.

A smaller factory was also built near the railway line of Blackburn–Wigan in Heapey.

Religion

The Church of England parish church of St Laurence, located on Union Street, has been a place of Christian worship for over 800 years. The Church of England parish church of St George, situated on St George's Street, is an important example of the work of architect Thomas Rickman, a major figure in the Gothic Revival. It was built as a Commissioners' church in 1822.

St Mary's Roman Catholic Church is based in the town centre at Mount Pleasant. The parish was founded in 1847, in a chapel in Chapel Street. The land for the church was purchased in 1851 and the first building erected in 1853. It was opened in June 1853.  The church can sit 750 persons.  Pugin & Pugin of London and Hansom are the architects.  

Chorley United Reformed Church is home to one of the oldest and largest United Reformed Churches in the north west. Founded in 1792 as an Independent Church it later affiliated to the Congregational church and in 1972 voted to become part of the new United Reformed Church (URC). The church is home to the oldest Scout Troop in the town, established in 1919. In January 2017 it was announced that the church building, which had been at its current site since 1792, would be demolished, and the congregation relocated to other premises.

The church enjoys extensive youth work, with two church youth groups affiliated to the URC's youth fellowship FURY, and a Junior Church together with Beavers, Cubs, Scouts, Rainbows, Brownies and Guides. During 2012, the church became the first church to advertise from the air when a very large cross was painted on the church car park.  The cross is now visible on earth mapping websites such as Google Earth.

In the north of the town, there is a park containing a meeting house and a temple of the Church of Jesus Christ of Latter-day Saints (LDS Church). The temple, which is regarded as a local landmark, is the largest LDS temple in Europe and named the Preston England Temple. Construction on the temple commenced in 1994 and was completed in 1998. Connected to the temple campus is the England Missionary Training Centre for the LDS Church which houses church representatives preparing to fill proselytizing and service assignments in Great Britain and other parts of Europe.

Chorley's only mosque is to be found on the corner of Brooke Street and Charnock Street. The building officially opened in March 2006, having been in planning for over three years.

Governance
In 1837, Chorley joined with other townships (or civil parishes) in the area to become head of the Chorley Poor Law Union which took responsibility for the administration and funding of the Poor Law in the area. Chorley became incorporated as a municipal borough in 1881, and was governed by a mayor and council of eight aldermen and twenty four councillors.

The population of the Municipal Borough of Chorley remained roughly static in the 20th century, with the 1911 census showing 30,315 people and the 1971 census showing 31,665. Under the Local Government Act 1972, Chorley became the core of a larger non-metropolitan district on 1 April 1974. The present Borough of Chorley has forty-two councillors, representing 14 three-member electoral wards in Chorley town council.

The Member of Parliament for the constituency of Chorley, since 1997, is Lindsay Hoyle, Speaker of the House of Commons. He was formerly a Labour MP.

Geography

The principal river in the town is the Yarrow. The Black Brook is a tributary of the Yarrow. The name of the River Chor was back-formed from "Chorley" and runs not far from the centre of the town, notably through Astley Park. Chorley is located at the foot of the West Pennine Moors and is overlooked by Healey Nab, a small hill which is part of the West Pennine Moors. It is the seat for the Borough of Chorley which is made up of Chorley and its surrounding villages.

Chorley had a population of 33,424 at the 2001 census, with the wider borough of Chorley having a population of 101,991. Chorley forms a conurbation with Preston and Leyland and was once proposed as being designated part of the Central Lancashire New Town under the New Towns Act, a proposal which was eventually scaled back.

Economy

The first signs of industry as with many towns in Lancashire was mining, evidence of which can be seen by the various abandoned quarries on the outskirts of the town. One of these is Anglezarke Quarry, between Chorley and Horwich. Remnants of mining include an old railway bridge from the Duxbury Mine off Wigan Lane. Eventually the mining industry was replaced by cotton mills.

Manufacture of trucks was inherited from the neighbouring town of Leyland. A large factory on Pilling Lane produced, including military vehicles and tanks during the Second World War. 

After the Second World War, production was reduced, and the final part of the site was closed in 2008 by BAE Systems. A large part of the site has been redeveloped for residential and industrial use as Buckshaw Village.
Through the twentieth century, especially the latter half, Chorley suffered the loss of much of its manufacturing capacity with great losses in or the completely disappearance of its coal, textiles, motor vehicles and armaments industries. 

Leyland Trucks and BAE Systems are the Central Lancashire area's largest employers at their sites in Leyland and Samlesbury respectively.

Companies with a presence in the borough are:
 BAE Systems
 Telent
 FedEx, North West depot located in the town
 DXC Technology, two locations, one in Euxton and the other in Clayton-le-Woods, north of Chorley
 Multipart Solutions Limited, successor to the parts arm of the Leyland DAF
 Porter Lancastrian is a manufacturer of beer pumps, under the Porta brand

In 2011, Chorley Council launched an initiative, "Choose Chorley", to encourage SME's and large businesses to relocate to Chorley. The initiative offers red carpet introductions to key people in the town, financial incentives and tailored support for business growth.

The town is the home of the Chorley cake. In October "Chorley Cake Street Fair", restarted in 1995, promotes the cakes, with a competition for local bakers to produce the largest ever Chorley cake.

Healthcare

Chorley is served by the local NHS hospital Chorley and South Ribble Hospital which is located on Euxton Lane, in addition to a private hospital located in Euxton. The town also had another major hospital formerly on Eaves Lane, before this closed in the 1990s. There was also the Heath Charnock isolation hospital on Hut Lane which dealt with infectious diseases before reverting to use for long term patients, before closing in the 1990s.

Transport

Road
Chorley is bisected by the A6 Roman road which goes straight through the town centre. The town is also near to the M61 of which Junction 6 and 8 serving the town. Also the M6 motorway serves the west of the town with Junction 27 connecting the town to the motorway, Charnock Richard services on the M6 are located in Chorley Borough.

Bus

The town's bus station, Chorley Interchange, opened in February 2003, replacing an older bus station also in the town centre. Bus services are provided by several operators:
Stagecoach North West operate bus services which connect the town to Bolton, Blackburn, Leyland, Preston and Manchester and the Network Chorley routes within the borough.
Blackburn Bus Company operate the bus service between Blackburn and Chorley.
National Express also operate a daily service from Chorley Interchange to London.

Rail

The main central railway station is Chorley railway station in the town centre. The railway station is used by:

TransPennine Express whose line runs between Manchester Airport direct to Scotland without changing.
Northern Manchester to Preston Line runs through Chorley and also connects the town to Bolton, Preston and Manchester.
The railway station was also served by the Wigan-Blackburn Railway line up until it was closed in 1960. The line also had stops at Heapey, Brinscall, Withnell and the White Bear railway station at Adlington.

Elsewhere in the borough there are railway stations at Euxton on the Wigan–Preston line, at Adlington and Buckshaw Village on the Manchester–Preston line, and at Croston on the Ormskirk Branch Line.

Waterways

The Leeds and Liverpool Canal runs parallel to Chorley and several marinas and locks are located on the Chorley area. Marinas along the canal include:

White Bear Marina, Adlington
Cowling Launch, Chorley
Top Lock, Whittle
 Botany Brow
 Botany Bay Boatyard
Riley Green, Hoghton

Education
Chorley is home to numerous primary schools, both council and church supported. Chorley has the following six high schools:

Holy Cross Catholic High School
Albany Academy
Bishop Rawstorne CE Academy
Parklands High School
Southlands High School
St. Michael's CE High School

Some independent schools are also present just outside the borough. Most Chorley children go on to attend the nearby Runshaw College in Leyland. Runshaw College has also expanded into the former administration site of ROF Chorley and is using, amongst others, the main administration building.

Lancashire College, based in Chorley, is a part of Lancashire County Council's Lancashire Adult Learning, offering a wide range of courses, a speciality being intensive residential language courses. From 1905 to 1981, the town was home to Chorley Training College (from the 1960s known as Chorley 'Day' Training College), designed by the Victorian and Edwardian architect Henry Cheers, and the town centre building now occupying this site is now Chorley Public Library.

Sport

Chorley is home to the semi professional football team, Chorley F.C., known as the Magpies due to their black and white strip. Founded as a rugby team in 1875, they switched to playing football eight years later. Since then they have had limited success, with their most memorable moments being two appearances in the second round of the FA Cup, and two seasons in the Football Conference in the late 1980s. They played in the National League in the 2019/20 season having won promotion from the National League North in the previous season, but were relegated back to the National League North. The team gained fame after qualifying for the 4th round of the 2020-21 season of the FA Cup.

The town and surrounding boroughs boast a number of cricket clubs, with two teams taking the town's name. Chorley Cricket Club currently play in the Northern League, and were finalists in the ECB National Club Cricket Championship for three consecutive seasons from 1994 to 1996, winning the trophy on the first two occasions. Chorley St James Cricket Club are the second side in the town, competing in the Southport & District Amateur Cricket League, having been members of the Chorley League until its demise in 2005.

The town is home to the Chorley Buccaneers American Football Club. Founded in the year 2000, the Bucs now have eight competitive teams and over 120 players competing in the BAFA National Leagues structure. They are based at Parklands Academy in Chorley. The club has three National Championship titles to their name in their 17-year existence, most recently in 2016.

Chorley RUFC was founded in the early 1970s and initially their matches were on played on fields at Astley Park. Since there was no club house in the early days the team played from the Prince of Wales pub, near the town's covered market. Work started on a new clubhouse on 22 March 1984 , on an area of land off Chancery Road, situated on the edge of the freshly constructed Astley Village Estate. The club currently run two senior sides and a mini section, the 1st XV playing in the RFU North Lancs 2 division.

Until 2004, Chorley had a rugby league side, Chorley Lynx, who played in League Two of the Rugby League National Leagues. The club was forced to close in 2004 due to small crowds and the withdrawal of funding by backer Trevor Hemmings. Many of the club's players and staff joined nearby Blackpool Panthers.

Chorley is home to track cyclists including Olympic gold medal winners Jason Queally and Bradley Wiggins, and Paralympic silver medallist Rik Waddon, due in part to the proximity of the town to the Manchester Velodrome. Chorley is also the home town of Paralympic gold medallist Natalie Jones.

The council owned leisure centre contains a swimming pool, sports hall, squash courts and a small fitness suite. The borough also includes other gym facilities, two other council-owned leisure centres, at Clayton Green and Coppull, and another public swimming pool at Brinscall. The town is also home to a Next Generation fitness centre, other private pools and leisure centres, and a David Lloyd Tennis Centre.

 south of Chorley town centre is Duxbury Park municipal golf course.

The town is home to many amateur football, rugby and cricket teams. There are also several grass football pitches, bowling greens and tennis courts. A public outdoor swimming pool in Astley Park was demolished in the 1990s for health and safety reasons.

Chorley Athletic and Triathlon Club regularly compete in road, cross country, fell, athletics and triathlon events. Chorley Cycling Club was formed in 2011, resurrecting a club which had disbanded around 1953. The club caters to both leisure and racing members and runs regular training and social rides on local roads.
Chorley JKS Shotokan Karate Club established a club in the town 2012.

Media
Chorley has two local newspapers: the weekly Chorley Guardian and the free Chorley Citizen.
A British comedy television show, Phoenix Nights, cited Chorley's radio station, Chorley FM, whose slogan was "Coming in your ears". The station, based in Chorley, originally broadcast for only a few weeks, but in 2005 received a licence to broadcast from Chorley Community Centre (see Chorley FM).

It is the home of actor Joseph Gilgun, of Brassic, This is England, Misfits and Preacher.

As well as Phoenix Nights, comedian Dave Spikey based his comedy series Dead Man Weds in, and filmed most of it in, Chorley. Steve Pemberton, the creator of The League of Gentlemen, based most of its characters on folk from Adlington.

Places of interest

Astley Park and Astley Hall 
Bank Hall  
Preston England Temple 
Duxbury Park and Golf Course 
White Coppice & Great Hill 
Heskin Hall 
Healey Nab 
Leeds & Liverpool Canal 
Rivington Pike  
Winter Hill 
Worden Park  
Yarrow Valley Country Park

Twin towns

Chorley is twinned with:
 Székesfehérvár, Hungary (1992)
 Lanzhou, China (2019)

Notable residents

Loui Batley (born 1987), (actress and dancer)
Bill Beaumont (born 1952), (former England rugby union captain)
Walter Berg (born 1947), (astrologer)
Leonora Carrington (1917–2011), (painter)
Phil Cool (born 1948), (comedian)
C. D. Darlington (1903–1981), (biologist)
Derek Draper (born 1967), (former Labour spin doctor and newspaper columnist)
Simon Farnworth (born 1963), (footballer, later physiotherapist)
John Foxx (born 1948), (musician)
Joseph Gilgun (born 1984), (actor)
Paul Grayson (born 1971), (England rugby union player)
Rick Guard (jazz singer and songwriter)
Sir Walter Haworth (1883–1950), (Nobel Prize winner)
Trevor Hemmings (1935-2021), (businessman)
Adam Henley (born 1994), (footballer, playing for Blackburn Rovers, later for Real Salt Lake in the MLS)
Teddy Hodgson (1885–1919), (from Chorley, played for Burnley F.C., F.A. Cup Winners against Liverpool in 1914)
Anna Hopkin MBE (born 1996), (swimmer and Olympic gold medallist)
Lindsay Hoyle (born 1957), (MP)
Conrad Hunte (1932–1999), (former West Indian Test cricketer, lived in Chorley before the 1957 Test Series against England)
Charles Lightoller (1874–1952), (highest-ranking crew member to survive the sinking of the RMS Titanic)
Paul McKenna (born 1977), (footballer)
Paul Mariner (1953–2021), (England international footballer)
Rifleman William Mariner VC (1882–1916), soldier awarded the Victoria Cross at Cambrin in 1915.
Barry Mason (1935–2021), (songwriter)
Ken Morley (born 1943), (actor)
Sheila Parker (born 1947), (former captain of the England women's national football team)
Phil Parkinson (born 1967), (footballer, later football manager)
Steve Pemberton (born 1967),  (actor)
Adam Nagaitis (born 1985), (actor)
Jason Queally (born 1970), (cyclist)
Thomas Rawlinson (18th-century industrialist, believed to have been born in Chorley)
Kevin Simm (born 1980), (musician of Liberty X and Wet Wet Wet fame, also winner of the fifth season of The Voice UK)
Tom Smith (born 1985), (cricketer)
Myles Standish (c. 1584 – 1656), (founder of the Pilgrim Fathers)
Starsailor (pop group)
Tom Criddle Stephenson (1893–1987), (journalist and champion of walkers' rights)
Sir Henry Tate (1819–1899), (sugar magnate and founder of the Tate Gallery, London)
Josh Charnley (born 1991), (rugby league footballer)
David Unsworth (born 1973), (Everton footballer, later Everton U-23 manager)
Mickey Walsh (born 1954), (former Irish international footballer)
Sir Holburt Jacob Waring Bt CBE FRCS (1866–1953), vice-chancellor of the University of London from 1922 to 1924
Rosemarie Wright (1931–2020), (pianist)

See also

 Listed buildings in Chorley

References

External links

Chorley Borough Council

 
Towns in Lancashire
Market towns in Lancashire
West Pennine Moors
Unparished areas in Lancashire
Geography of Chorley